Hamro Team is a Nepalese television soap opera, produced by AB Pictures Pvt. Ltd. Hamro Team and is directed by Bhusan Dahal. And it has been telecasted in the Kantipur Television.

Series Overview

Episode list

Series One (2011)

Notes

References

Hamro Team